Sundhiyamau is a census village & village panchayat in Tehsil Ramnagar of Barabanki district in the state of Uttar Pradesh, India.

Geography
Sundhiyamau is located at

References

External links
 Sundhiyamau in Census-2011 
 सुढ़ियामऊ हिन्दी विकीपीडिया पृष्ठ पर जायें

Villages in Barabanki district